Aaron Abeyta (born August 8, 1965), better known as El Hefe or simply Hefe, from el Jefe (Spanish for "the boss"), is an American musician and actor, best known as the lead guitarist and trumpet player for the California punk band NOFX. He started playing guitar at the age of 13, but he states that he started taking it seriously at the age of 15, joining his first band. He joined NOFX in 1991 and his first recording with the band was his contribution to their EP The Longest Line.

Abeyta was given his nickname by NOFX founder Fat Mike because at the time when Abeyta joined the band, Fat Mike was dating a girl named Erin and he didn't want there to be any confusion. 

El Hefe once owned a nightclub called "Hefe's" in Eureka, California, and now lives in Stevenson Ranch, California. He has two children and is divorced from Jennifer Abeyta.

NOFX albums with El Hefe 

1992: The Longest Line
1992: White Trash, Two Heebs and a Bean
1994: Punk in Drublic
1995: I Heard They Suck Live!!
1996: Heavy Petting Zoo
1997: So Long and Thanks for All the Shoes
1999: The Decline
2000: Pump Up the Valuum
2002: 45 or 46 Songs That Weren't Good Enough to Go on Our Other Records
2003: The War on Errorism
2006: Wolves in Wolves' Clothing
2007: They've Actually Gotten Worse Live!
2009: Coaster
2011: NOFX
2012: Self Entitled
2013: Stoke Extinguisher
2016: First Ditch Effort
2021: Single Album

See also 
List of guitarists

References

External links 
 

1965 births
Living people
NOFX members
American punk rock guitarists
American musicians of Mexican descent
American male guitarists
20th-century American guitarists
21st-century American guitarists
Berklee College of Music alumni
Hispanic and Latino American musicians